Mbarara–Ntungamo–Kabale–Katuna Road is a road in the Western Uganda, connecting the city of Mbarara, in Mbarara District, with the towns of Ntungamo, Kabale and Katuna at the international border with the Republic of Rwanda.

Location
The road starts at Mbarara (pop. 195,238), the largest city in the Western Region of Uganda. It continues in a southwesterly direction through Ntungamo and Kabale to end at Katuna at the international border with Rwanda, a distance of about  The coordinates of the road, immediately south of Ntungamo are:0°54'10.0"S, 30°15'14.0"E (Latitude:-0.902778; Longitude:30.253889).

Upgrading to bitumen
The road was divided into two sections: (a) Mbarara-Ntungamo Section, was budgeted at UShs154 billion (€51 million) and (b) Ntungamo-Katuna Section was budgeted at UShs198.26 billion (€65 million). The Ugandan government was budgeted to contribute 8 percent of the grant value (approximately €9.28 million). The construction contract was awarded to Reynolds Construction Company of Switzerland, the lowest bidder. The work was designated in December 2011. As of August 2016, Uganda National Roads Authority listed the road as an ongoing project. By May 2018, the last section of this road was reported as completed.

See also
 Economy of Uganda
 Transport in Uganda
 List of roads in Uganda
 Uganda National Roads Authority

References

External links
 Uganda National Road Authority Homepage

Roads in Uganda
Mbarara District
Ntungamo District
Rukiga District
Kabale District
Ankole sub-region
Kigezi sub-region
Western Region, Uganda